The house at 519 Golconda Avenue is a cottage located in Kingman, Arizona. It is listed on the National Register of Historic Places. It was evaluated for National Register listing as part of a 1985 study of 63 historic resources in Kingman that led to this and many others being listed.

Description 
The house at 519 Golconda Avenue in Kingman, Arizona was built in 1897. The house is an indigenous cottage. This is another south side home across the railroad track. This house was a typical workers' home. The house is on the National Register of Historical Places in 1986.

References

Houses completed in 1887
Houses in Kingman, Arizona
Houses on the National Register of Historic Places in Arizona
National Register of Historic Places in Kingman, Arizona